Tom, Dick, & Harry is an Indian Hindi comedy film released on 12 May 2006. It stars Dino Morea, Jimmy Sheirgill, Anuj Sawhney, Celina Jaitly, Kim Sharma, Gulshan Grover and Shakti Kapoor. It had music by Himesh Reshammiya who made a special appearance in the film. The screenplay is actually a mixture of two different plots taken from two different films with similar titles: the 1941 American classic Tom, Dick and Harry and the 1993 Hong Kong hit Tom, Dick and Hairy.

It pays a small tribute to Bollywood as it contains multiple references to older films and has a number of unforgettable Bollywood characters from earlier movies.

Plot
This is a comedy about three physically impaired men: Tarun/Tom (deaf), Deepak/Dick (blind) and Harshvardhan/Harry (mute). They live together as paying guests, and their life takes an endearing turn when a beautiful girl Celina comes to live in the bungalow opposite their house.  They start making their moves to cast an impression on her, who is least interested in acknowledging their presence. In Tom’s life there’s Bijlee, a fisherwoman, who is completely besotted by him and does not leave any stone unturned to express her desire. On the other hand, there is Suprano (Gulshan Grover) a bad man who is out to prove that he is the worst villain ever and has with him some of Bollywood's most dreaded criminals, Shakaal from film Shaan, Gabbar Singh from Sholay and Mogambo from Mr. India, making an indestructible Suprano. Tom, Dick and Harry unknowingly become the target of Suprano, by being the biggest barriers in his business deals. The movie depicts the three friend struggles with their disabilities and how they have to fight against Suprano.

Cast
 Dino Morea as Tarun "Tom"
 Jimmy Sheirgill as Harshvardhan "Harry"
 Anuj Sawhney as Deepak "Dick"
 Celina Jaitly as Celina
 Kim Sharma as Bijli
 Gulshan Grover as Suprano
 Shakti Kapoor as Inspector P.K. Waghmare
 Rakesh Bedi as Happy Singh
 Kunika as Jassi Singh
 Shashi Kiran as Shopkeeper
 Avtar Gill as Celina's uncle
 Shehzad Khan
 Himesh Reshammiya as himself in song "Zara Jhoom Jhoom" (special appearance)

Reception

Critical reception
The film received mixed but mostly negative reviews. Taran Adarsh from Bollywood Hungama said "The choice of the story and screenplay is what acts as a major turn-off, the music is the only saving grace. Dino Morea tries hard, but in vain. His timing is just not right. Jimmy Shergill doesn't deliver either. And why is he looking pale at most times? Anuj Sawhney is excellent and is the best performer in the crowd. He's a complete natural. Celina is wasted. Kim Sharma will be loved by the commoners. Gulshan Grover is efficient as the weird don. On the whole, Tom Dick and Harry is too weak a fare to leave any impression whatsoever".  Nikhil Kumar of Apunkachoice.com called the film "Silly, childish humour, poor script and shoddy direction mark the triple whammy for Tom Dick And Harry, which is tripe of a film. The movie's director Deepak Tijori ought to know that childish buffoonery is not synonymous to comedy".

Box office
It grossed 8 crores at the box office, altogether the total net gross was 11 crores. Overall it was declared average.

Soundtrack
Music is Composed by Himesh Reshammiya and Lyrics by Sameer

Sequels
A sequel, titled Tom, Dick, and Harry: Rock Again..., released in 2009. It was directed by Rahul Kapoor and  starred a completely different cast altogether. The film  featured the song "Mein Tere Pyar Mein" by Mika Singh which has been produced by Vikas Kohli at Fatlabs studio.

In 2016, another sequel went into production directed by Deepak Tijori and starring Jimmy Sheirgill, Aftab Shivdasani, Sharman Joshi, Sana Khan, Pooja Chopra and Amyra Dastur.

References

External links
 

2006 comedy films
2006 films
2000s Hindi-language films
Indian remakes of Hong Kong films
Films scored by Jeet Ganguly
Films directed by Deepak Tijori
Films scored by Himesh Reshammiya
Indian comedy films
Hindi-language comedy films